Ademar Moreira Marques  (born 4 March 1959 in Lisbon) is a former Portuguese footballer who played as midfielder.

Personal
His son Renato Marques is a professional footballer.

External links 
 

Living people
1959 births
Portuguese footballers
Association football midfielders
Primeira Liga players
Sporting CP footballers
C.S. Marítimo players
FC Porto players
C.F. Os Belenenses players
Vitória F.C. players
S.C. Farense players
Portugal international footballers
Footballers from Lisbon